

Events

Births

Deaths
 Einion ap Gwalchmai (born unknown), one of the Welch Poets of the Princes (approx.)
 Alamanda de Castelnau (born 1160), trobairitz

See also

Poetry
 List of years in poetry

13th-century poetry
Poetry